McTaggart is a village in the Canadian province of Saskatchewan within the Rural Municipality of Weyburn No. 67 and Census Division No. 2.

History 
McTaggart incorporated as a village on October 5, 1909.

Demographics 

See also 
 List of communities in Saskatchewan
 Villages of Saskatchewan

References

Villages in Saskatchewan
Weyburn No. 67, Saskatchewan
Division No. 2, Saskatchewan